National Route 411 is a national highway of Japan connecting Hachiōji and Kōfu in Japan, with a total length of 118.5 km (73.63 mi).

References

National highways in Japan
Roads in Tokyo
Roads in Yamanashi Prefecture